Patrick Cripps (born 18 March 1995) is a professional Australian rules footballer playing for the Carlton Football Club in the Australian Football League (AFL). Cripps won the Leigh Matthews Trophy in 2019 and the Brownlow Medal in 2022, and is a three-time All-Australian and a four-time John Nicholls Medallist, becoming the second-youngest player to win the latter when he first won the award in 2015. Cripps served as Carlton co-captain from 2019 to 2021, and has served as the sole captain since the 2022 season.

Early life
Cripps was born in Perth, but at a young age moved to the small farming town of Northampton in Western Australia's Mid West. Cripps played junior football in Northampton, and then moved to Perth and played juniors and colts for the East Fremantle Football Club in the West Australian Football League. He represented Western Australia at the 2013 AFL Under 18 Championships, serving as vice-captain and winning a place in the All-Australian Team for the tournament.

AFL career
Cripps was recruited by the Carlton Football Club with its first round selection in the 2013 AFL National Draft (No. 13 overall). Even as a junior, his playing style as a strong-bodied midfielder with a strong ability to win clearances by handpass drew comparisons with club great Greg Williams. Cripps made his senior debut against Melbourne in Round 4, 2014, but played only three matches during the season due to injuries. Cripps changed from his debut jumper number of 16 at the end of the 2014 season, to number 9 after it was vacated after the delisting of Kane Lucas.

In just his second season, Cripps at 195 cm/6 ft 5 in established himself as a top inside midfielder, finishing 8th in the league for contested possessions and 11th for clearances, and earning strong acclaim for his attacking use of handball. He finished second in the 2015 AFL Rising Star award after holding favouritism with bookmakers for much of the year, and he won the John Nicholls Medal as Carlton's best and fairest to become the second-youngest winner in the award's history.

In 2016, Cripps further solidified his place as one of the best inside midfielders in the AFL amassing 185 clearances at an average of 8.8 per game, ranked #1 in the AFL as well as 354 contested possessions at an average of 16.9, ranked #2 in the AFL for the season. After a slow start to the 2017 whilst recovering from a back injury Cripps found form to average 24.9 disposals and 6.7 clearances from 15 games before his season was cut short with a broken leg.

Before the beginning of the 2018 season, he was announced as joint vice-captain of Carlton, along with defender Sam Docherty.
Cripps had a magnificent 2018, winning his second Carlton Best and Fairest, All Australian honours and finishing second in AFL MVP voting. Averaging over 29 touches a game, Cripps managed to become the leading contested possession winner for a single season haul, eclipsing Patrick Dangerfield's previous benchmark of 386 with 388. He later re-signed with the club until the end of the 2021 season.

In October 2018, Cripps and Sam Docherty were named Carlton co-captains.

In 2019, Cripps would deliver his finest season yet, averaging a staggering 8.5 clearances, 17 contested possessions and 6.2 tackles a game. This would be enough to secure the Leigh Matthews Trophy. 

It has been speculated that Patrick Cripps was suffering through a chronic back issue during the seasons of 2020 and 2021, which saw considerable drops in his performance. Though, this was never confirmed by the club or Patrick himself. 

The year 2022 started with Patrick polling 25 of a  possible maximum 30 votes in the AFLCA MVP over the first three rounds, before injuring a hamstring against the Gold Coast Suns in round four. 
Cripps won the 2022 Brownlow Medal by 1 vote becoming the first Carlton player to win it since Chris Judd in 2010.

Statistics
Updated to the end of round 1, 2023.

|-
| 2014 ||  || 16
| 3 || 0 || 1 || 10 || 17 || 27 || 5 || 9 || 0.0 || 0.3 || 3.3 || 5.7 || 9.0 || 1.7 || 3.0 || 0
|-
| 2015 ||  || 9
| 20 || 6 || 13 || 158 || 313 || 471 || 64 || 98 || 0.3 || 0.7 || 7.9 || 15.7 || 23.6 || 3.2 || 4.9 || 6
|-
| 2016 ||  || 9
| 21 || 10 || 14 || 176 || 390 || 566 || 68 || 139 || 0.5 || 0.7 || 8.4 || 18.5 || 27.9 || 3.2 || 6.6 || 18
|-
| 2017 ||  || 9
| 15 || 7 || 4 || 168 || 206 || 374 || 65 || 90 || 0.5 || 0.3 || 11.2 || 13.7 || 24.9 || 4.3 || 6.0 || 5
|-
| 2018 ||  || 9
| 22 || 11 || 15 || 259 || 393 || 652 || 92 || 138 || 0.5 || 0.7 || 11.8 || 17.9 || 29.6 || 4.2 || 6.3 || 20
|-
| 2019 ||  || 9
| 20 || 13 || 6 || 212 || 348 || 560 || 62 || 123 || 0.7 || 0.3 || 10.6 || 17.4 || 28.0 || 3.1 || 6.2 || 26
|-
| 2020 ||  || 9
| 17 || 7 || 11 || 153 || 181 || 334 || 40 || 81 || 0.4 || 0.6 || 9.0 || 10.6 || 21.6 || 2.4 || 4.8 || 10
|-
| 2021 ||  || 9
| 20 || 13 || 11 || 163 || 305 || 468 || 63 || 85 || 0.7 || 0.6 || 8.2 || 15.3 || 23.4 || 3.2 || 4.3 || 5
|-
| 2022 ||  || 9
| 21 || 20 || 9 || 226 || 365 || 591 || 76 || 105 || 1.0 || 0.4 || 10.8 || 17.4 || 28.1 || 3.6 || 5.0 || bgcolor=98FB98 | 29±
|-
| 2023 ||  || 9
| 1 || 0 || 1 || 9 || 16 || 25 || 2 || 6 || 0.0 || 1.0 || 9.0 || 16.0 || 25.0 || 2.0 || 6.0 || 
|- class=sortbottom
! colspan=3 | Career
! 160 !! 87 !! 85 !! 1533 !! 2535 !! 4068 !! 537 !! 874 !! 0.5 !! 0.5 !! 9.6 !! 15.8 !! 25.4 !! 3.4 !! 5.5 !! 119
|}

Notes

Personal Life 
Patrick Cripps is related to former West Coast Eagles footballer Chris Mainwaring through his father. Cripps' father is Mainwaring's first cousin, and the two are also related to current West Coast Eagles player Jamie Cripps. Cripps also grew up near another former Eagle in Daniel Chick.

On the 31st of December, 2022, Patrick Cripps married his partner Monique Fontana in Perth, Western Australia. The ceremony was attended by several of Cripps' Carlton teammates, and other top players in the AFL including Lachie Neale, Tom Papley and Tom Mitchell (Australian footballer) were in attendance.

Honours and achievements
 Carlton co-captain: 2019–2021; captain: 2022–present
 Brownlow Medal: 2022
 Leigh Matthews Trophy: 2019
 3× All-Australian team: 2018, 2019, 2022
 4× John Nicholls Medal: 2015, 2018, 2019, 2022
 All Stars representative honours in State of Origin for Bushfire Relief Match
 2× 22under22 team: 2015, 2016
 AFL Rising Star nominee: 2015

References

External links

 
 
 

Carlton Football Club players
East Fremantle Football Club players
1995 births
Living people
Australian rules footballers from Western Australia
John Nicholls Medal winners
People from Northampton, Western Australia
Leigh Matthews Trophy winners
All-Australians (AFL)